Karthika or Kartika may refer to:

Entertainment 
 Kartika (album), a 2003 album by The Eternal
 Karthika (film), Indian Malayalam film in 1968
 Kartika (TV series), a Disney India sitcom

People
 Karthika (name), including a list of persons with the name
 Karthika (Malayalam actress)
 Kartika (model) (born 1977), a Brazilian model

Other 
 Kartika (knife), used in Buddhist ritual
 Kartika (month), in the Hindu calendar or Karthikai in the Tamil calendar
 Kartika I (rocket), the first Indonesian sounding rocket
 Kartika Airlines

See also
 
 Karthik (disambiguation)
 Karthikeyan